Ushakovo is a rural locality (a village) in Botanovskoye Rural Settlement, Mezhdurechensky District, Vologda Oblast, Russia. The population was 3 as of 2002.

Geography 
Ushakovo is located 31 km southwest of Shuyskoye (the district's administrative centre) by road. Igumnitsevo is the nearest rural locality.

References 

Rural localities in Mezhdurechensky District, Vologda Oblast